Edgar Barrett (26 June 1869 – 29 April 1959) was an Australian cricketer. He played five first-class cricket matches for Victoria between 1889 and 1895.

See also
 List of Victoria first-class cricketers

References

External links
 

1869 births
1959 deaths
Australian cricketers
Victoria cricketers
Cricketers from Melbourne